Lester is a city in Lyon County, Iowa, United States. The population was 296 at the time of the 2020 census.

Geography
Lester's longitude and latitude coordinates in decimal form are 43.437475, -96.333322.

Demographics

2010 census
As of the census of 2010, there were 294 people, 109 households, and 80 families living in the city. The racial makeup of the city was 93.5% White, 0.3% African American, 0.7% Native American, 0.3% Asian, 4.1% from other races, and 1.0% from two or more races. Hispanic or Latino of any race were 5.4% of the population.

There were 109 households, of which 33.9% had children under the age of 18 living with them, 66.1% were married couples living together, 1.8% had a female householder with no husband present, 5.5% had a male householder with no wife present, and 26.6% were non-families. 24.8% of all households were made up of individuals, and 11.9% had someone living alone who was 65 years of age or older. The average household size was 2.70 and the average family size was 3.26.

The median age in the city was 34 years. 33% of residents were under the age of 18; 6.8% were between the ages of 18 and 24; 22.1% were from 25 to 44; 21.5% were from 45 to 64; and 16.7% were 65 years of age or older. The gender makeup of the city was 48.6% male and 51.4% female.

2000 census
As of the census of 2000, there were 251 people, 103 households, and 70 families living in the city. The racial makeup of the city was 99.20% White, and 0.80% from two or more races.

There were 103 households, out of which 26.2% had children under the age of 18 living with them, 62.1% were married couples living together, 4.9% had a female householder with no husband present, and 32.0% were non-families. 29.1% of all households were made up of individuals, and 17.5% had someone living alone who was 65 years of age or older. The average household size was 2.44 and the average family size was 3.06.

In the city, the population was spread out, with 21.9% under the age of 18, 14.3% from 18 to 24, 22.3% from 25 to 44, 19.5% from 45 to 64, and 21.9% who were 65 years of age or older. The median age was 39 years. For every 100 females there were 80.6 males. For every 100 females age 18 and over, there were 84.9 males.

The median income for a household in the city was $38,750, and the median income for a family was $47,083. Males had a median income of $27,083 versus $20,938 for females. The per capita income for the city was $17,410. About 3.1% of families and 4.3% of the population were below the poverty line, including none of those under the age of eighteen or sixty five or over.

References

External links

 
City-Data Comprehensive Statistical Data and more about Lester

Cities in Iowa
Cities in Lyon County, Iowa